David Selman (1878 – August 1, 1937) was an American film director.

Selected filmography
 South Sea Love (1923)
 Kentucky Days (1923)
 Remember (1926)
 Resurrection (1931)
 The Westerner (1934)
 Fighting Shadows (1935)
 Gallant Defender (1935)
 Justice of the Range (1935)
 The Revenge Rider (1935)
 Riding Wild (1935)
 Square Shooter (1935)
 Secret Patrol (1936)
 The Mysterious Avenger (1936)
 Tugboat Princess (1936)
 The Cowboy Star (1936)
 Woman Against the World (1937)
 Find the Witness (1937)
 Texas Trail (1937)

References

Bibliography
 Larry Langman & Daniel Finn. A Guide to American Crime Films of the Thirties. Greenwood Press, 1995.

External links

1878 births
1937 deaths
American film directors
Place of birth missing
Death in California